Fan Barry was an Irish hurler. His championship career with the Cork senior team lasted from 1919 until 1920.

Barry made his debut with the Cork senior team during the 1919 championship and was a regular member of the panel for the following two years. During this time he won his sole All-Ireland medal. Barry also won two Munster medals.

Honours

Cork
All-Ireland Senior Hurling Championship (1): 1919
Munster Senior Hurling Championship (2): 1919, 1920

References

St Mary's (Shandon) hurlers
Cork inter-county hurlers
Year of birth missing
Year of death missing